The Primetime Emmy Award for Outstanding Unstructured Reality Program is handed out annually at the Creative Arts Emmy Award ceremony.

In 2014, Outstanding Reality Program was separated into two categories – Outstanding Structured Reality Program and Outstanding Unstructured Reality Program. The category of "unstructured reality program" is defined as consisting of reality shows that "contain story elements driven by the actions of characters and lacking a consistent structured template."

In the following list, the first titles listed in gold are the winners; those not in gold are nominees, which are listed in alphabetical order. The years given are those in which the ceremonies took place:

Winners and nominations
Outstanding Reality Program

2000s

2010s

Outstanding Unstructured Reality Program

2020s

Programs with multiple wins

3 wins
 Deadliest Catch
 United Shades of America with W. Kamau Bell

2 wins
 Kathy Griffin: My Life on the D-List

Programs with multiple nominations
Totals include nominations for Outstanding Documentary or Nonfiction Series and Outstanding Hosted Nonfiction Series or Special. 

16 nominations
 Antiques Roadshow

13 nominations
 Deadliest Catch

6 nominations
 Intervention
 Kathy Griffin: My Life on the D-List
 RuPaul's Drag Race: Untucked

5 nominations
 United Shades of America with W. Kamau Bell

4 nominations
 Born This Way
 Project Greenlight

2 nominations
 Alaska: The Last Frontier
 American High
 Cheer
 Gaycation with Ellen Page
 Million Dollar Listing New York
 Naked and Afraid
 The Osbournes
 Selling Sunset
 Trauma: Life in the E.R.
 Wahlburgers

See also
 Critics' Choice Television Award for Best Unstructured Reality Show

Notes

References

Unstructured Reality Program
American reality television series